The 1997 WCHA Men's Ice Hockey Tournament was the 38th conference playoff in league history and 45th season where a WCHA champion was crowned. The tournament was played between March 7 and March 15, 1997. First round games were played at home team campus sites while all 'Final Five' matches were held at the Civic Center in St. Paul, Minnesota. By winning the tournament, North Dakota was awarded the Broadmoor Trophy and received the WCHA's automatic bid to the 1997 NCAA Division I Men's Ice Hockey Tournament.

Format
The first round of the postseason tournament featured a best-of-three games format. All ten conference teams participated in the tournament and were seeded No. 1 through No. 10 according to their final conference standing, with a tiebreaker system used to seed teams with an identical number of points accumulated. The top five seeded teams each earned home ice and hosted one of the lower seeded teams.

The winners of the first round series advanced to the Civic Center for the WCHA Final Five, the collective name for the quarterfinal, semifinal, and championship rounds. The Final Five uses a single-elimination format. Teams were re-seeded No. 1 through No. 5 according to the final regular season conference standings, with the top three teams automatically advancing to the semifinals and the remaining two playing in a quarterfinal game. The semifinal pitted the top remaining seed against the winner of the quarterfinal game while the two other teams that received byes were matched against one another with the winners advancing to the championship game and the losers meeting in a Third Place contest. The Tournament Champion received an automatic bid to the 1997 NCAA Division I Men's Ice Hockey Tournament.

Conference standings
Note: GP = Games played; W = Wins; L = Losses; T = Ties; PTS = Points; GF = Goals For; GA = Goals Against

Bracket
Teams are reseeded after the first round

Note: * denotes overtime period(s)

Quarterfinals

(1) North Dakota vs. (10) Michigan Tech

(2) Minnesota vs. (9) Alaska-Anchorage

(3) St. Cloud State vs. (8) Northern Michigan

(4) Colorado College vs. (7) Wisconsin

(5) Denver vs. (6) Minnesota-Duluth

Quarterfinal

(4) Colorado College vs. (5) Denver

Semifinals

(1) North Dakota vs. (4) Colorado College

(2) Minnesota vs. (3) St. Cloud State

Third Place

(3) St. Cloud State vs. (4) Colorado College

Championship

(1) North Dakota vs. (2) Minnesota

Tournament awards

All-Tournament Team
F Kevin Hoogsteen (North Dakota)
F Ryan Kraft (North Dakota)
F Toby Petersen (Colorado College)
D Curtis Murphy (North Dakota)
D Brian LaFleur (Minnesota)
G Aaron Schweitzer (North Dakota)

MVP
David Hoogsteen (North Dakota)

See also
Western Collegiate Hockey Association men's champions

References

External links
WCHA.com
1996–97 WCHA Standings
1996–97 NCAA Standings
2012–13 Alaska-Anchorage Seawolves Media Guide
2013–14 Colorado College Tigers Media Guide
2013–14 Denver Pioneers Media Guide
2013–14 Minnesota Golden Gophers Media Guide 
2012–13 Minnesota-Duluth Bulldogs Media Guide
2013–14 North Dakota Hockey Media Guide
2006–07 Northern Michigan Wildcats Media Guide
2011–12 St. Cloud State Huskies Media Guide
2003–04 Wisconsin Badgers Media Guide

WCHA Men's Ice Hockey Tournament
Wcha Men's Ice Hockey Tournament